Following is a sortable table of public charter schools in the U.S. State of Colorado:


Table

See also

Charter school
Education in Colorado
State of Colorado
Colorado Department of Education
List of colleges and universities in Colorado
List of school districts in Colorado
:Category:Charter schools in Colorado

References

External links
Charter School Institute
Colorado Department of Education
Colorado League of Charter Schools

 
Charter Schools
Charter schools